Trier-Föhren Airfield  serves Trier, a city in Rhineland-Palatinate, Germany. The airfield supports general aviation, with no commercial airline service available. Charter services and a full selection of amenities are available.

The current field is a recent facility, opened in 1977, built about 18 km from the site of the historic Trier Airfield built in the early 20th century.

History
Trier-Föhren Airfield was built from scratch to replace the old Trier Airfield in the 1970s. It is  next to the village of Föhren. A French army garrison formerly at Trier Airfield also moved to Föhren until it was disbanded in the 1990s. Since then, the "Industriepark Region Trier" was developed on its former site.

Facilities

See also

 Transport in Germany
 List of airports in Germany

References

External links
 Official website

Airports in Rhineland-Palatinate
Trier